The Maragondon–Magallanes–Amuyong Road or Maragondon–Magallanes–Alfonso Road is a two- to four-lane, secondary road in Cavite, Philippines. It connects the municipality of Maragondon and the municipality of Alfonso.

The entire road is designated as National Route 406 (N406) of the Philippine highway network.

Intersections

References

External links 
 Department of Public Works and Highways

Roads in Cavite